Kosa Pan (1633 – 15 November 1699) was a Siamese diplomat and minister who led the second Siamese embassy to France sent by King Narai in 1686. He was preceded to France by the first Siamese embassy to France, which had been composed of two Siamese ambassadors and Father Bénigne Vachet, who had left Siam for France on January 5, 1684.

Family 

Through his father, Pan was allegedly a descendant of Phraya Kiarti, a Mon noble who sided with Naresuan during the fourth Burmese-Siamese War, as well as being either a grandnephew or a grandson of King Ekathotsarot. Pan was a great-great-grandfather of King Rama I, the founder of the Chakri Dynasty. His older brother, Lek (เหล็ก), held the post of foreign minister before him.

Early life
Pan was born to a Siamese woman Chao Mae Wat Dusit in Ayutthaya Kingdom in 1633. Chao was then a wet nurse for Phetracha in 1632, and later for Prince Narai. Pan was a kind of foster brother to them. Chao's connection, if any, with the then-reigning Sukhothai dynasty of the Ayutthaya Kingdom is unclear, with some speculating her to be a daughter or niece of King Ekathotsarot.

Names
Pan was his given name. As foreign minister, he was styled Chaophraya Kosathibodi. He is colloquially called Kosa Pan.

He is also known by his former style as a first-class diplomat: Ok-phra Wisut Sunthon. Contemporary French documents recorded his name as Ooc, Pravisoutsonthoon Raatchathoud (ออกพระวิสุทธสุนทร ราชทูต).

His success in diplomatic negotiations earned him the epithet golden-tongued diplomat.

Embassy to France (1686)

To accompany the return of the 1685 French embassy to Siam of Chevalier de Chaumont and François-Timoléon de Choisy, Pan was selected by Constantine Phaulkon, the Prime Counsellor to King Narai, to lead an embassy to France. Pan set out for France in 1686 on two French ships with two other Siamese ambassadors, Ok-luang Kanlaya Ratchamaitri and Ok-khun Si Wisan Wacha, and by the Jesuit Father Guy Tachard.

The embassy was bringing a proposal for an eternal alliance between France and Siam. Pan's embassy was met with a rapturous reception and caused a sensation in the courts and society of Europe. The mission landed at Brest, France and journeyed to Versailles, constantly surrounded by crowds of curious onlookers. The embassy stayed in France from June 1686 to March 1687.

1688 Siamese revolution

Upon his return to Siam, Pan was pressured to become a supporter of Phetracha's anti-French faction of dissatisfied nobles, who resented the power that the French held in Siam. The following revolution toppled Narai and ousted the French forces. Pan was sent to negotiate with their officials. He was appointed by Phetracha as his Minister of Foreign Affairs and Trade.

Pan was met in Siam in 1690 by the German naturalist Engelbert Kaempfer. The naturalist noted "pictures of the Royal family of France and European maps" hanging "in the hall of his [Pan's] house":

In 1699, Pan and Phetracha received a visit from the Jesuit Father Guy Tachard. The meeting was formal and did not produce any closer relations.

Death
Pan was later accused of having affinity to the French and loyalty to his former King, Narai. He was disgraced, and King Phetracha ordered his nose cut off. He reportedly committed suicide on 15 November 1699, according to the Dutch. His duties were taken over by Okya Maha Amath, one of the King's favorites. Pan is said to be the direct ancestor of King Rama I, founder of the present ruling dynasty of Thailand.

See also
France-Thailand relations

Notes

References
 Gunn, Geoffrey C. (2003) First Globalization: The Eurasian Exchange, 1500-1800 Rowman & Littlefield 
 Smithies, Michael (1999), A Siamese embassy lost in Africa 1686, Silkworm Books, Bangkok, 
 Smithies, Michael (2002), Three military accounts of the 1688 "Revolution" in Siam, Itineria Asiatica, Orchid Press, Bangkok, 
 Suarez, Thomas (1999) Early Mapping of Southeast Asia Tuttle Publishing

External links
 E-books
 
 
 

Ambassadors of Ayutthaya to France
17th-century diplomats
1633 births
1699 deaths
Year of birth unknown
Chaophraya
Thai people of Mon descent
Nobility of the Ayutthaya Kingdom